Nara Bahadur Dahal (born 17 August 1960) is a Nepalese long-distance runner. He competed in the men's 10,000 metres at the 1980 Summer Olympics.

References

External links
 

1960 births
Living people
Athletes (track and field) at the 1980 Summer Olympics
Nepalese male long-distance runners
Olympic athletes of Nepal
Place of birth missing (living people)